Amir Gulistan Janjua (c. 14 August 1925 – 19 February 2019) was a former governor of the North-West Frontier Province of Pakistan.

Biography 
He was born on 14 August 1925 in village Gorha Rajgan, Choa Saiden Shah in Chakwal tehsil. His father, Raja Feroz Khan Janjua, upon hearing the birth news of the son at Fort Lockhart, shared this news with a local Malik. The Malik looked jubilantly at Fort Gulistan and said , “Amir of Gulistan has arrived ”. So, the child was named Amir Gulistan.

He was awarded Sitara-e-Quaid-e-Azam and Tamgha-e-Pakistan, Nishan-e-Taj (Iran), Grand Order of Kokab (Jordan) and Order of Gorkha Dakshina Bahu (Nepal).

Janjua died on 19 February 2019 in Rawalpindi.

Awards and decorations

Foreign Decorations

References

Governors of Khyber Pakhtunkhwa
1920s births
2019 deaths
Pakistan Army officers
Order of Gorkha Dakshina Bahu